The Lesedi Local Municipality council consists of twenty-six members elected by mixed-member proportional representation. Thirteen councillors are elected by first-past-the-post voting in thirteen wards, while the remaining thirteen are chosen from party lists so that the total number of party representatives is proportional to the number of votes received. In the election of 1 November 2021 the African National Congress (ANC) won a plurality of seats on the council.

The planned abolition of the Lesedi, and its absorption into Ekurhuleni after the 2016 municipal elections, was blocked by the High Court of South Africa in 2015.

Results 
The following table shows the composition of the council after past elections.

December 2000 election

The following table shows the results of the 2000 election.

March 2006 election

The following table shows the results of the 2006 election.

May 2011 election

The following table shows the results of the 2011 election.

August 2016 election

The following table shows the results of the 2016 election.

November 2021 election

The ANC lost its majority for the first time, winning a plurality of thirteen. The following table shows the results of the 2021 election.

References

Lesedi
Sedibeng District Municipality